Ironing is the use of an iron to remove wrinkles from fabric.

Ironing may also refer to:
 Ironing (metalworking)
 Breast ironing
 Extreme ironing